The 2002 Bassetlaw District Council election took place on 2 May 2002 to elect members of Bassetlaw District Council in Nottinghamshire, England as part of the 2002 United Kingdom local elections.

The whole council was elected due to changes to ward boundaries following an electoral review by the Boundary Committee for England.

Election result
The Labour Party won a majority of seats and retained control of the council.

Ward results

Beckingham

Blyth

Carlton

Clayworth

East Markham

East Retford East

East Retford North

East Retford South

East Retford West

Everton

Harworth

Langold

Misterton

Rampton

Ranskill

Sturton

Sutton

Tuxford and Trent

Welbeck

Worksop East

Worksop North

Worksop North East

Worksop North West

Worksop South

Worksop South East

References

2002 & 2003 Bassetlaw Election results

2002 English local elections
2002
2000s in Nottinghamshire